The 1962 NCAA College Division football season was the seventh season of college football in the United States organized by the National Collegiate Athletic Association at the NCAA College Division level.

Conference standings

Rankings

Small college poll
In 1962, both United Press International (UPI) and the Associated Press (AP) conducted "small college" polls, and selected different number one teams. UPI's panel of coaches selected Southern Miss, who had a record of 9–1 with their sole defeat coming in an 8–6 loss to Memphis State. The AP's panel of sportswriters selected Florida A&M, who had a 9–0 record including four shutouts. The Rattlers went on to play Jackson State in the Orange Blossom Classic, but lost 22–6.

United Press International (coaches) final poll
Published on November 29

Associated Press (writers) final poll
Published on November 30

Northern Illinois actually 8–2 when the poll was taken.

See also
 1962 NCAA University Division football season
 1962 NAIA football season

References